Sandbar Lake Provincial Park is a provincial park located  north of Ignace, Ontario.

References

External links

Provincial parks of Ontario
Parks in Kenora District
Protected areas established in 1970
1970 establishments in Ontario